Mayur Patel is an Indian actor who works in Kannada-language films. He is known for his role in the film Mani (2003).

Career
Mayur Patel made his lead debut in the film Mani (2003). The film released to positive reviews although the film failed at the box office. He next starred in Love Story (2005), a remake of the 1978 Telugu film Maro Charitra. He was reported to direct the Hindi remake of his father Madan Patel's Yarivaanu (2013), but the film did not enter production.

In 2014, he participated in the second season of Bigg Boss Kannada. He made his comeback as a lead actor with Rajeeva IAS (2020) but the film released to mixed reviews.

Filmography 
All films are in Kannada.

References

External links 

Madan and Mayur Patel to contest elections The Times of India
Kannada actor Mayur Patel threatened over land dispute The Times of India
Mayur makes a comeback The New Indian Express

Male actors in Kannada cinema
Indian male film actors
Living people
21st-century Indian male actors
Year of birth missing (living people)